Fushimi Station is the name of multiple train stations in Japan.

 Fushimi Station (Kyoto) - on the Kintetsu Kyoto Line in Fushimi-ku, Kyoto, Kyoto Prefecture
 Fushimi Station (Nagoya) - on the Nagoya Subway Higashiyama Line and the Nagoya Subway Tsurumai Line in Naka-ku, Nagoya, Aichi Prefecture
 Fushimi-Inari Station, Fushimi-Momoyama Station - on the Keihan Railway Keihan Main Line (both are located in Fushimi-ku, Kyoto)